Tašmišu  (Tashmishu) was a Hurrian god. He was regarded as a brother of Teshub, and it is assumed he had a warlike character.

Character
Volkert Haas proposed that Tašmišu's name was derived from the Hurrian word tašmi, which he translates as strong. The suffix -šu is also known from the name of one Teshub's bulls, Šerišu, and various Hurrian personal names, such as Anniwašu or Ekammešu.

Tašmišu  was one of the multiple warrior gods in the Hurrian pantheon. Other such deities were Ugur, Aštabi, Nergal and Ḫešui.

In myths, his position appears to be that of a subordinate of his brother Teshub, and in one passage from the Song of Ullikummi he outright addresses him as "my lord." He served as his sukkal (attendant deity), though as noted by Daniel Schwemer this role in ritual texts could also be attributed to the god Tenu. He proposed that the latter was adopted from the religious tradition of ancient Aleppo, where a month was named after him. However, Alfonso Archi ascribes Hurrian origin to Tenu.

Associations with other deities
Tašmišu was regarded as the "pure brother" of Teshub. Their sister was the goddess Šauška. Their parents were Anu and Kumarbi. Tašmišu's wife was the goddess Nabarbi.

Hittites identified Tašmišu with their god Šuwaliyat, who had old Anatolian (Hattian) origin. However, Tašmišu never acquired the latter's association with vegetation. Both of them could be associated with Mesopotamian Ninurta. As a result, instances where Tašmišu's name is written logographically as dNIN.URTA are known. Another attested logographic writing is dURAŠ.  Furthermore, a god list from Emar identifies him with Papsukkal.

Worship
In Hurrian offering lists, Tašmišu usually follows Teshub. Worship of him is best attested from the Hurrian kingdom of Kizzuwatna, where he appears in various festivals related to Teshub of Šapinuwa. He is also attested among the gods worshiped in Lawazantiya.

In Emar, both Tašmišu  and Tenu were worshiped as members of the entourage of Teshub.

Mythology
The first myth of the so-called "Kumarbi cycle" describes the birth of Tašmišu. Like his brother, he was born after Kumarbi bit off the genitals of Anu. 

In the Song of Ullikummi, Tašmišu joins his siblings Teshub and Šauška when they go to see eponymous stone giant after being warned by the sun god Šimige. Later he reveals Teshub's fate after the initial confrontation with the monster to his wife Hebat. He also suggests to his brother that to find a way to defeat the new adversary they need to meet with the god Ea in his dwelling, Abzu, in the Hurrian myth assumed to be a city rather than a body of water. After Ea agrees to listen to them, Tašmišu shows his gratitude.

References

Bibliography

Hurrian deities
War gods